George David Nott (born ) is a professional rugby union player who plays as a lock or flanker for Dragons RFC and previously for London Irish. Born in Bodelwyddan, Wales, Nott was raised in Llandudno and Mold, and has represented England at Under-20 level.

Career
Nott started all five games for the England under-20 team that hosted the 2016 World Rugby Under 20 Championship including the victory against Ireland in the final.

He came through the academy at Sale and made his professional club debut in a European Rugby Champions Cup defeat away to Munster on 25 January 2015. Nott made his Premiership debut in February 2017 against the Newcastle Falcons and made a total of 36 senior appearances for the Sharks.

In August 2019 it was announced that he would be joining London Irish.

He left the club to join the United Rugby Championship's Dragons ahead of the 2022–23 season.  As at Sale, he made his debut against Munster, this time finishing on the winning side as the Dragons won their first home game for 17 months in a 23-17 win.

References

1996 births
Living people
Fylde Rugby Club players
Sale Sharks players
London Irish players
Rugby union locks
Rugby union flankers
People educated at The King's School, Chester
Rugby union players from Denbighshire
Welsh rugby union players
Dragons RFC players